Ben Procter (born 11 March 1990) is a British Paralympic swimmer competing in S14 classification events. Procter participated in the 2012 Summer Paralympics as part of the Great Britain team. In 2010 he qualified for the Swimming World Championships in Eindhoven and achieved his first world podium finish, taking bronze in the 200m freestyle.

References

Living people
1990 births
English male freestyle swimmers
Paralympic swimmers of Great Britain
Swimmers at the 2012 Summer Paralympics
S14-classified Paralympic swimmers
Medalists at the World Para Swimming Championships
Medalists at the World Para Swimming European Championships
British male medley swimmers